Pinguipes is a small genus of sandperches belonging to the fish family Pinguipedidae found in waters off South America.

Species
The two species of Pinguipes are:

 Pinguipes brasilianus Cuvier, 1829 – Brazilian sandperch 
 Pinguipes chilensis Valenciennes, 1833 – Chilean sandperch

References

Pinguipedidae
Ray-finned fish genera
Taxa named by Georges Cuvier